This list of historical fiction is designed to provide examples of notable works of historical fiction (in literature, film, comics, etc.) organized by time period.

For a more exhaustive list of historical novels by period, see :Category:Historical novels by setting, which lists relevant Wikipedia categories; see also the larger List of historical novels, which is organized by country, as well as the more general :Category:Historical novels and :Category:Historical fiction.

Novels

Set in Prehistory (c. 30,000 BC – 3000 BC)

Earth's Children series by Jean Auel
Stonehenge by Bernard Cornwell
Pillar of the Sky by Cecelia Holland
Mammoth Trilogy by Stephen Baxter
The Gathering Night by Margaret Elphinstone
Chronicles of Ancient Darkness by Michelle Paver
First North Americans by W. Michael Gear and Kathleen O'Neal Gear
The King Must Die and The Bull from the Sea by Mary Renault
The Inheritors by William Golding
The Quest for Fire by J.-H. Rosny

Set in Classical Antiquity (c. 3000 BC – 500 AD)

Pharaoh by Bolesław Prus
The Egyptian and The Secret of the Kingdom by Mika Waltari
River God by Wilbur Smith
Child of the Morning by Pauline Gedge
Men of Bronze by Scott Oden
Death Comes as the End by Agatha Christie
The Song of Achilles by Madeline Miller
Troy Series by David Gemmel
Homer's Daughter by Robert Graves
Creation by Gore Vidal
Gates of Fire, Last of the Amazons, The Virtues of War, The Afghan Campaign and Tides of War by Steven Pressfield
Hannibal by Ross Leckie
Salammbô by Gustave Flaubert
Fire from Heaven, The Persian Boy, and Funeral Games by Mary Renault
Child of a Dream, The Sands of Ammon, and The Ends of the Earth (Alexander Trilogy) by Valerio Massimo Manfredi
Memnon by Scott Oden
The Source by James A. Michener
The Red Tent by Anita Diamant
Lavinia by Ursula K. Le Guin
Masters of Rome series by Colleen McCullough
Roma Sub Rosa series by Steven Saylor
Imperium, Lustrum, and Dictator (Cicero Trilogy) by Robert Harris
Emperor series by Conn Iggulden
Kleopatra Pharaoh by Karen Essex
The Memoirs of Cleopatra by Margaret George
The Ides of March by Thornton Wilder
Augustus by John Williams
Ben-Hur: A Tale of the Christ by Lew Wallace
King Jesus by Robert Graves
The Bronze Bow by Elizabeth George Speare
Christ the Lord: Out of Egypt and Christ the Lord: The Road to Cana by Anne Rice
The Gospel According to the Son by Norman Mailer
The Gospel According to Lazarus by Richard Zimler
The Last Temptation of Christ by Nikos Kazantzakis
The Robe by Lloyd C. Douglas
I, Claudius and Claudius the God by Robert Graves
Eagles of the Empire series and Gladiator series by Simon Scarrow
Quo Vadis: A Narrative of the Time of Nero by Henryk Sienkiewicz
The Last Days of Pompeii by Edward Bulwer-Lytton
Pompeii by Robert Harris
Memoirs of Hadrian by Marguerite Yourcenar
The Eagle of the Ninth by Rosemary Sutcliff
Helena by Evelyn Waugh
Judge Dee by Robert Van Gulik
Romance of the Three Kingdoms by Luo Guanzhong and retold by Eiji Yoshikawa
Julian by Gore Vidal
Raptor by Gary Jennings
A Struggle for Rome by Felix Dahn

Set in the Middle Ages (c. AD 500 – 1500)

A Dream of Eagles (aka Camulod Chronicles) by Jack Whyte (4th–6th)
The Warlord Chronicles by Bernard Cornwell (6th)
Count Belisarius by Robert Graves (6th)
Pope Joan by Donna Woolfolk Cross (9th)
The Saxon Stories by Bernard Cornwell (9th–10th)
Corban Loosestrife series by Cecelia Holland (10th)
The Whale Road, The Wolf Sea and others (Oathsworn series) by Robert Low (late 10th)
The Long Ships (Röde Orm) by Frans G. Bengtsson (late 10th)
The Evening and the Morning (Kingsbridge series) by Ken Follett (late 10th)
Lion of Ireland and Pride of Lions by Morgan Llywelyn (late 10th–early 11th)
Vinland by George Mackay Brown (early 11th)
The Physician by Noah Gordon (11th)
Samarkand by Amin Maalouf (11th)
The Jester by James Patterson and Andrew Gross (11th)
The Last English King by Julian Rathbone (mid-11th)
The Wake by Paul Kingsnorth (late 11th)
King Raven series (Hood, Scarlet, and Tuck) by Stephen R. Lawhead (late 11th)
When Christ and His Saints Slept, Time and Chance, and Devil's Brood (Plantagenet series) by Sharon Kay Penman (12th)
The Pillars of the Earth (Kingsbridge series) by Ken Follett (12th)
The Walking Drum by Louis L'Amour (12th)
The Cadfael Chronicles by Ellis Peters (mid-12th)
The Ruby in Her Navel by Barry Unsworth (12th)
Kay the Left-Handed by Leslie Barringer (12th)
Anna of Byzantium by Tracy Barrett (12th)
Gertrude and Claudius by John Updike (12th)
The Sign of the Chrysanthemum by Katherine Paterson (12th)
Witiko by Adalbert Stifter
New Tale of the Heike by Eiji Yoshikawa (late 12th)
Ivanhoe, The Talisman and others (Waverley Novels) by Sir Walter Scott (late 12th)
Insurrection by Robyn Young (13th)
Wolf of the Plains, Lords of the Bow and others (Conqueror series) by Conn Iggulden (13th)
Here Be Dragons, Falls the Shadow, and The Reckoning (Welsh Princes series) by Sharon Kay Penman (13th)
Brethren, Crusade, and Requiem (Brethren Trilogy) by Robyn Young (13th)
Poland by James A. Michener (mid-13th–early 15th)
The Journeyer by Gary Jennings (late 13th–early 14th)
The Lion of Flanders by Hendrik Conscience (late 13th–early 14th)
The Name of the Rose by Umberto Eco (early 14th)
Valperga by Mary Shelley (early 14th)
Harlequin, Vagabond, Heretic and 1356 (The Grail Quest series) by Bernard Cornwell (14th)
The Accursed Kings (Les Rois maudits) by Maurice Druon (14th)
Katherine by Anya Seton (14th)
World Without End (Kingsbridge series) by Ken Follett (14th)
The Knights of the Cross (Krzyżacy) by Henryk Sienkiewicz (14th–early 15th)
Cathedral of the Sea (La catedral del mar) by Ildefonso Falcones (late 14th)
Morality Play by Barry Unsworth (late 14th)
L'Anneau du pêcheur by Jean Raspail (late 14th–early 15th)
Azincourt by Bernard Cornwell (early 15th)
The Sunne in Splendour by Sharon Kay Penman (15th)
The Hunchback of Notre-Dame by Victor Hugo
The House of Niccolò series by Dorothy Dunnett (mid-15th)
Quentin Durward by Walter Scott (15th)
The Birth of Venus by Sarah Dunant (late 15th)
The Family by Mario Puzo (late 15th)
Romola by George Eliot (late 15th)
I, Mona Lisa by Jeanne Kalogridis (late 15th)

Set in the Early Modern Period (c. 1500 – 1760)

Prince of Foxes by Samuel Shellabarger (early 16th)
Leonardo's Swans by Karen Essex (early 16th)
Then and Now by W. Somerset Maugham
Three Sisters, Three Queens by Philippa Gregory
The Heart of Jade (El corazón de piedra verde) by Salvador de Madariaga (early 16th)
The Last Kabbalist of Lisbon by Richard Zimler (early 16th)
Wolf Hall and Bring Up the Bodies by Hilary Mantel (16th)
Aztec by Gary Jennings (16th)
The Bridge on the Drina by Ivo Andrić (16th-20th)
The Tournament by Matthew Reilly (mid-16th)
Matthew Shardlake series by C. J. Sansom (mid-16th)
Lymond Chronicles by Dorothy Dunnett (mid-16th)
Brazil Red by Jean-Christophe Rufin (mid-16th)
The Siege of Malta by Walter Scott (mid-16th)
My Name is Red by Orhan Pamuk (late 16th)
La Reine Margot by Alexandre Dumas (late 16th)
Shōgun by James Clavell (late 16th)
A Dead Man in Deptford by Anthony Burgess (late 16th)
Kenilworth by Walter Scott (late 16th)
The Orenda by Joseph Boyden (early 17th)
The Three Musketeers by Alexandre Dumas (early 17th)
Black Robe by Brian Moore
The White Castle by Orhan Pamuk (17th)
Hunger's Brides by W. Paul Anderson (17th)
Silence by Shūsaku Endō (17th)
With Fire and Sword, The Deluge and Fire in the Steppe by Henryk Sienkiewicz (17th)
Waverley, Rob Roy and others (Waverley Novels) by Walter Scott (17th)
I promessi sposi (The Betrothed) by Alessandro Manzoni (mid-17th)
The Scarlet Letter by Nathaniel Hawthorne (mid-17th)
Captain Alatriste by Arturo Pérez-Reverte (mid-17th)
Royal Escape by Georgette Heyer (mid-17th)
An Instance of the Fingerpost by Iain Pears (mid-17th)
Seek the Fair Land by Walter Macken (mid-17th)
Girl with a Pearl Earring by Tracy Chevalier (mid-17th)
The Deer and the Cauldron by Jin Yong (late 17th)
Shinjū, The Snow Empress and others (Sano Ichiro series) by Laura Joh Rowland (late 17th)
Imprimatur by Rita Monaldi and Francesco Sorti (late 17th)
Leo Africanus and Balthasar's Odyssey by Amin Maalouf (16th / 17th)
Hawaii, Chesapeake and Caribbean by James A. Michener
Pirate Latitudes by Michael Crichton (17th)
The Bridge of San Luis Rey by Thornton Wilder (early 18th)
Leatherstocking Tales by James Fenimore Cooper (18th)

Set during the Industrial Revolution and Napoleonic era (c. 1760 – 1850)

Perfume: The Story of a Murderer by Patrick Süskind
Mason & Dixon by Thomas Pynchon
The Bastard, The Rebels and others (The Kent Family Chronicles) by John Jakes 
Logan by John Neal
Drums Along the Mohawk by Walter D. Edmonds
Seventy-Six by John Neal
Sergeant Lamb of the Ninth and Proceed, Sergeant Lamb by Robert Graves
The Revolution at Sea saga by James L. Nelson
The Fort by Bernard Cornwell
Sharpe series by Bernard Cornwell
A Tale of Two Cities by Charles Dickens
Scaramouche by Rafael Sabatini
Les Misérables by Victor Hugo
La Sanfelice by Alexandre Dumas
Aubrey–Maturin series by Patrick O'Brian
Hornblower series by C. S. Forester
Lord Ramage by Dudley Pope
The Bolitho novels by Alexander Kent
The Secret River by Kate Grenville
The Count of Monte Cristo by Alexandre Dumas
Stealing Athena by Karen Essex
Wellington and Napoleon Quartet by Simon Scarrow
National Episodes by Benito Pérez Galdós
Measuring the World by Daniel Kehlmann (early 19th)
War and Peace by Leo Tolstoy
The Berrybender Narratives by Larry McMurtry
The Revenant by Michael Punke
The Awakening Land trilogy by Conrad Richter
Johnny Tremain by Esther Forbes
Burr by Gore Vidal
Poldark series by Winston Graham
A Place Called Freedom by Ken Follett
Alaska by James A. Michener
The Confessions of Nat Turner by William Styron
Roots: The Saga of an American Family by Alex Haley
April Morning by Howard Fast
The Book of Negroes by Lawrence Hill
Montevideo, or the new Troy by Alexandre Dumas
The Playmaker by Thomas Keneally
The Far Pavilions by M. M. Kaye (19th)

Set during recent history (c. 1850 – 1950)

The Starbuck Chronicles by Bernard Cornwell
The Great Train Robbery by Michael Crichton
Peony by Pearl S. Buck (1850s)
The Four Horsemen of the Apocalypse by Vicente Blasco Ibáñez
Cézanne’s Quarry by Barbara Corrado Pope
The Blood of Lorraine by Barbara Corrado Pope
The Missing Italian Girl by  Barbara Corrado Pope
The Lambing Flat by Nerida Newton
The Last Crossing by Guy Vanderhaeghe
Imperial Woman by Pearl S. Buck (1860s – 1900s)
North and South trilogy by John Jakes
The Killer Angels by Michael Shaara
Shiloh by Shelby Foote
Little House on the Prairie series by Laura Ingalls Wilder
Silk by Alessandro Baricco (1860s)
Lonesome Dove series by Larry McMurtry
The Sackett series by Louis L'Amour
The Assassination of Jesse James by the Coward Robert Ford by Ron Hansen (1881–1882)
Narratives of Empire series by Gore Vidal
An Officer and a Spy by Robert Harris (1890s–1900s)
Ragtime, Billy Bathgate, The March by E. L. Doctorow
Fall of Giants, Winter of the World, and Edge of Eternity by Ken Follett
Centennial, The Covenant, Texas, and Journey by James A. Michener
The Flashman Papers by George MacDonald Fraser (19th)
The Road to Wellville by T. C. Boyle
The War of the End of the World (La guerra del fin del mundo) by Mario Vargas Llosa (late 19th)
Tai-Pan and Gai-Jin by James Clavell
The Alienist and The Angel of Darkness (Kreizler series) by Caleb Carr 
The L.A. Quartet and the Underworld USA Trilogy by James Ellroy
The James Reasoner Civil War Series by James Reasoner
Beloved by Toni Morrison
The Emigrants series by Vilhelm Moberg
The Thorn Birds by Colleen McCullough
Gone with the Wind by Margaret Mitchell
The Prague Cemetery by Umberto Eco
Drood by Dan Simmons
The Sorrow of Belgium by Hugo Claus (WWI)
A Star Called Henry by Roddy Doyle (1910s)
Troubles by J. G. Farrell (1919–1921)
The Haj by Leon Uris (1922–1950s)
The Winds of War and War and Remembrance by Herman Wouk (WWII)
Schindler's Ark by Thomas Keneally (WWII)
Enigma by Robert Harris (WWII)
The Warsaw Anagrams by Richard Zimler (WWII)
Exodus by Leon Uris (1940s)
The City Beautiful by Aden Polydoros (1893)

Theatre

Set 2000 BC – 600 AD
Antony and Cleopatra, Julius Caesar, Timon of Athens, Titus Andronicus by William Shakespeare
Britannicus by Jean Racine
Caligula by Albert Camus
Cato, a Tragedy by Joseph Addison
The Death of Pompey by Pierre Corneille
Socrates on Trial by Andrew David Irvine
Caesar and Cleopatra by George Bernard Shaw
The Siege of Numantia by Miguel de Cervantes
Salome by Oscar Wilde

Set 600 AD – 1550St Joan by George Bernard Shaw
William Shakespeare's English history playsEdward II, Tamburlaine, and The Massacre at Paris by Christopher MarloweHenry IV by Luigi PirandelloIn Extremis: The Story of Abelard & Heloise and Anne Boleyn by Howard BrentonThe Jester's Supper by Sem BenelliMarie Tudor by Victor HugoGötz von Berlichingen by Johann Wolfgang von GoetheMurder in the Cathedral by T. S. Eliot

Set after 1550Egmont and Torquato Tasso by Johann Wolfgang von GoetheMary Stuart and Demetrius by Friedrich SchillerCross and Sword by Paul GreenCromwell by Victor Hugo

Opera

Set 3000 BC – 600 ADAida and Nabucco by Giuseppe VerdiAkhnaten by Philip GlassCléopâtre and Hérodiade by Jules MassenetMosè in Egitto by Gioachino RossiniGiulio Cesare by George Frideric HandelLes Troyens by Hector BerliozSapho by Charles GounodL'Olimpiade by MetastasioGermanicus by Georg Philipp Telemann

Set 600 AD – 1800Gustave III by Daniel AuberHenry VIII by Camille Saint-SaënsWilliam Tell by Gioachino RossiniLes Huguenots and Le prophète by Giacomo MeyerbeerFosca and Salvator Rosa by Antônio Carlos GomesFernand Cortez by Gaspare SpontiniThérèse by Jules MassenetLe roi l'a dit by  Léo DelibesTamerlano and Rodelinda by George Frideric HandelLes Abencérages by Luigi CherubiniMontezuma by Roger SessionsMacbeth by Giuseppe Verdi

Films and television

Set in Prehistory (c. 30,000 BC – 3000 BC)2001: A Space Odyssey 1968. First section.Iceman 2017

PoetryThe Destruction of Sennacherib by Lord Byron: Assyrian siege of Jerusalem, 8th century BCThe Light of Asia by Sir Edwin Arnold: life of Gautama Buddha, 6th or 5th century BCThe Rape of Lucrece by William Shakespeare: reign of Lucius Tarquinius Superbus in Rome, 6th century BCHoratius by Thomas Babington Macaulay: Horatius Cocles vs Lars Porsena, Rome, 6th century BC Roderick the Last of the Goths by Robert Southey: reign of Roderic, 8th century HispaniaKing Alfred by John Fitchett: reign of Alfred the Great, 9th century EnglandThe Ballad of the White Horse by G. K. Chesterton: reign of Alfred the Great, 9th century EnglandThe Saga of King Olaf by Henry Wadsworth Longfellow: reign of Olaf Tryggvason, 10th century NorwayMadoc by Robert Southey: legend of Madoc, 12th century WalesIsabella, or the Pot of Basil and The Eve of St. Agnes by John Keats: European Middle AgesMarmion by Sir Walter Scott: reign of Henry VIII of England  & the Battle of Flodden, 1513The Revenge: A Ballad of the Fleet by Alfred, Lord Tennyson: Battle of Flores, 1591Bonnie Dundee by Sir Walter Scott: Viscount Dundee and the Jacobite rising of 1689Evangeline by Henry Wadsworth Longfellow: the Expulsion of the Acadians (1755–1764)Paul Revere's Ride by Henry Wadsworth Longfellow: American Revolutionary War (1775)Battle of Niagara by John Neal: War of 1812

Comics

PrehistoricRahan by Roger Lecureux and Jean-François LecureuxAkim by Roberto Renzi

Ancient300 by Frank MillerAge of Bronze by Eric Shanower

Wuxia manhuaThree Kingdoms by Yū TerashimaFung Wan by Ma Wing-shingCrouching Tiger, Hidden Dragon by Andy SetoThe Ravages of Time by Chan MouThreads of Time by Noh Mi-youngYing Xiong Wu Lei by Ma Wing Shing

Samurai mangaRurouni Kenshin by Nobuhiro WatsukiAzumi by Yū KoyamaPath of the Assassin'' by Kazuo Koike

See also
List of historical novels
List of historical novelists
Fiction set in ancient Greece
Fiction set in ancient Rome

External links
Database of German historical novels
Historical Fiction database, divided by time period.
A Guide to the Best Historical Novels and Tales by Jonathan Nield (1902). Project Gutenberg etext (accessed 05-2014)
A selection of historical novels set by epoch and author. (accessed 08-2010)

Lists of mass media